Ealing Hospital is a district general NHS hospital, part of London North West University Healthcare NHS Trust, located in the Southall district of the London Borough of Ealing, West London, England. It lies on the south side of the Uxbridge Road 8.5 miles west of central London. It sits between Southall town centre to the west and Hanwell to the east. It is built on land that was once part of St. Bernard's Hospital which is run by West London Mental Health (NHS) Trust. The Ealing Hospital Interchange bus station is adjacent to the hospital.

History

Early history
The original hospital in the area was the Ealing Cottage Hospital which opened at Minton Lodge in Ealing Dene in 1871. This was replaced by the King Edward Memorial Hospital, named in memory of King Edward VII which was opened by Princess Helena in 1911. The hospital joined the National Health Service in 1948 and came under the management of the North West Metropolitan Regional Hospital Board.
 
The present Ealing District Hospital was built in the late 1970s and opened 5 November 1979. Occupying part of St. Bernard's Hospital former grounds, the whole complex was renamed Ealing Hospital. At the same time, the King Edward Memorial was closed along with the nearby Hanwell Cottage Hospital in Green Lane and many of the services provided by the Southall-Norwood Hospital on The Green were transferred to the new hospital. The adjacent St. Bernard's Hospital regaining its old identity to provide mental health services once more.

Merger
In October 2014, as part of a drive towards efficiency savings in the NHS, Ealing Hospital NHS Trust merged with The North West London Hospitals NHS Trust.
Ealing Hospital underwent a merger process that saw acute services distributed between itself, Northwick Park and St Mark's Hospital, and Central Middlesex Hospital. It is anticipated that there will be a phased removal of acute care services from Ealing Hospital in the medium to long-term.

History of maternity unit
The original NHS provision for births was Perivale Maternity Hospital, Greenford. 
With a total of 67 beds and ten cots in a special care baby unit, Ealing residents 'chose' to have 33.5% of their births here at a rate of 1,800 per annum. (Queen Charlotte's Hospital came second with 23.5%). Various working committees agreed that for various reasons it would be better to move the facilities at Perivale to a new maternity unit located on the same site as Ealing General. Thus, on 1 March 1985, a proposal was submitted outlining a number of options together with assessments of relative costs and benefits. The aim was for a 60 beds unit to be able to reach 2,500 deliveries per annum.  The new Ealing Maternity Unit opened in March 1988  on the south-west corner of Ealing General.

Due to the centralisation of maternity units in North West London, in May 2015, the decision was made for the maternity unit at Ealing Hospital to be closed. From 31 June 2015, women were no longer able to give birth at Ealing Hospital.

Quality of care
In 2008 Ealing Hospital Trust was listed last out of the 165 trusts in England in a survey of patients' ratings of the level of care. Director of Nursing Paul Reeves said that the data was collected in August 2007 and the trust was addressing the issues with a series of action plans.

In 2008/09 Ealing Hospital did well in a Dr Foster patient safety enquiry achieving a band 4 – better than many other hospitals in the surrounding area.

In September 2014, following the closure of nearby Emergency Departments at Central Middlesex and Hammersmith Hospitals, there was a significant increase in pressure on surrounding departments, including at Ealing Hospital, where the percentage of patients being seen under 4 hours fell to 67.8%.
An independent review is ongoing about the impact the decision to close these departments has had on emergency care in the North West London area.

Care UK runs an urgent care centre on the site which was investigated by ITV's Exposure programme in July 2015.

Notes

See also
 Healthcare in London
 List of hospitals in England
 List of NHS trusts

References

External links

Transport for London: Bus services to and from Hanwell. Retrieved 2007-06-05
 National Rail Station:  Hanwell. Retrieved 2007-06-05
 Addiction Network in association with Chaucer Clinic (alcoholism) and Nick Charles . Retrieved 2008-10-27.
 Ealing Hospital NHS Trust -official website. Retrieved 2013-04-25.
Healthcare Commission. Standards of care review for:   Ealing NHS Hospital. Retrieved 2007-05-19.
 Meadow House Hospice. Retrieved 2013-04-25.
 Moorfields Eye Hospital NHS Foundation Trust.
 UNISON: Private Finance Initiative (PFI). Retrieved 2007-06-05
 Unison (January 2007 Revised edition). In the Interests of Patients? The impact of the creation of a commercial market in the provision of NHS Care. Retrieved 2007-09-15

NHS hospitals in London
Hospital buildings completed in 1979
Health in the London Borough of Ealing
Southall